The FC Istiklol 2014 season was Istiklol's sixth Tajik League season. They won the League for the third time, whilst also winning the Supercup and defending their Tajik Cup title. Mubin Ergashev was appointed the club's new manager 13 January 2014, guiding the team to an undefeated season.

Squad

Out on loan

Transfers

Winter

In:

Out:

Summer

In:

Out:

Friendlies

Competitions

Tajik Supercup

Tajik League

Results summary

Results by round

Results

League table

Tajik Cup

Squad statistics

Appearances and goals

|-
|colspan="14"|Players away from Istiklol on loan during the season:

|-
|colspan="14"|Players who appeared for Istiklol no longer at the club:

|}

Goal scorers

Disciplinary record

See also
List of unbeaten football club seasons

References

External links 
 FC Istiklol Official Web Site

FC Istiklol seasons
Istiklol